The 2014 Shanghai Rolex Masters was a tennis tournament played on outdoor hard courts. It was the sixth edition of the Shanghai ATP Masters 1000, classified as an ATP World Tour Masters 1000 event on the 2014 ATP World Tour. It took place at Qizhong Forest Sports City Arena in Shanghai, China from October 5 to October 12, 2014.

Points and prize money

Point distribution

Prize money

Singles main-draw entrants

Seeds

 1 Rankings are as of September 29, 2014

Other entrants
The following players received wildcards into the singles main draw:
  Juan Mónaco
  Wang Chuhan
  Wu Di 
  Zhang Ze

The following player received entry as a special exempt:
  Martin Kližan

The following players received entry from the qualifying draw:
  Teymuraz Gabashvili
  Andrey Golubev
  Sam Groth
  Malek Jaziri
  Thanasi Kokkinakis
  Bernard Tomic
  James Ward

Withdrawals
Before the tournament
  Nicolás Almagro → replaced by  Vasek Pospisil
  Juan Martín del Potro (wrist injury) → replaced by  Dominic Thiem
  Tommy Haas → replaced by  Pablo Andújar
  Lleyton Hewitt → replaced by  Donald Young
  Philipp Kohlschreiber → replaced by  Jack Sock
  Gaël Monfils → replaced by  Steve Johnson
  Radek Štěpánek → replaced by  Mikhail Kukushkin
  Jo-Wilfried Tsonga → replaced by  Édouard Roger-Vasselin
  Fernando Verdasco → replaced by  Ivan Dodig

Retirements
  Milos Raonic (flu)

Doubles main-draw entrants

Seeds

 Rankings are as of September 29, 2014

Other entrants
The following pairs received wildcards into the doubles main draw:
  Gong Maoxin /  Li Zhe
  Wu Di /  Zhang Ze
The following pair received entry as alternates:
  Jamie Murray /  John Peers

Withdrawals
During the tournament
  Ernests Gulbis (shoulder injury)

Retirements
  Rajeev Ram (back injury)

Finals

Singles

 Roger Federer def.  Gilles Simon 7–6(8–6), 7–6(7–2)

Doubles

 Bob Bryan /  Mike Bryan def.  Julien Benneteau /  Édouard Roger-Vasselin 6–3, 7–6(7–3)

References

External links
Official Website

 
Shanghai ATP Masters 1000
Shanghai Masters (tennis)
Shanghai Rolex Masters
Shanghai Rolex Masters